Proburnetia is an extinct genus of biarmosuchian therapsids in the family Burnetiidae, from the Late Permian of Russia. It had bizarre bumps and protrusions on its skull.

Proburnetia had a 20 cm skull, and a total length up to 1.5 m.

References

Burnetiamorphs
Prehistoric therapsid genera
Lopingian synapsids of Europe
Permian Russia
Fossils of Russia
Fossil taxa described in 1968
Taxa named by Leonid Petrovich Tatarinov